The 1963–64 Women's Handball European Champions Cup was the fourth edition of the premier international competition for European women's handball clubs, taking place from November 1963 to April 1964. Thirteen teams took part in the competition, with 1963 finalists Soviet Union and Denmark and debutante Norway being granted byes to the quarterfinals. The final was carried out as a single match taking place in Bratislava on April 4.

Rapid Bucharest won the competition beating Helsingør IF in a tight final, becoming the second and last to date Romanian team to win the competition. Defending champion Trud Moscow was ousted in the quarterfinals by Budapesti Spartacus.

First round

Quarter-finals

Semifinals

Final

References

European Cup women
European Cup women
Women's EHF Champions League
Eur
Eur